Saptapadi is regarded to be the most important rite of a Hindu wedding ceremony. After tying the sacred knot known as the mangalasutra, the newly-wed couple takes seven steps together, during which the marriage is solemnised. After the seventh step is taken, the marriage of the couple is regarded to be irrevocable.

The saptapadi is sometimes mistaken with Saat Phere.

Description
The saptapadi is an ancient ritual that dates back to the Vedic period. The circumambulation of the sacred altar of fire is a rite that is performed differently in various regions of South Asia. In some regions, the couple walks around the altar seven times. In other regions, the couple takes seven steps to complete a single circumambulation. At each step or circuit, the couple may also take various vows, the content of which varies from region to region.

Vows 
In Eastern India, South India and Western India, during the Hindu wedding, the couple say these words as they complete the seven steps of the saptapadi: 
"Now let us make a vow together. We shall share love, share the same food, share our strengths, share the same tastes. We shall be of one mind, we shall observe the vows together. I shall be the Samaveda, you the Rigveda, I shall be the Upper World, you the Earth; I shall be the Sukhilam, you the Holder - together we shall live and beget children, and other riches; come thou, O sweet-worded girl!"

In North Indian weddings, the bride and the groom say the following words after completing the seven steps:
"We have taken the Seven Steps. You have become mine forever. Yes, we have become partners. I have become yours. Hereafter, I cannot live without you. Do not live without me. Let us share the joys. We are word and meaning, united. You are thought and I am sound. May the night be honey-sweet for us. May the morning be honey-sweet for us. May the earth be honey-sweet for us. May the heavens be honey-sweet for us. May the plants be honey-sweet for us. May the sun be all honey for us. May the cows yield us honey-sweet milk. As the heavens are stable, as the earth is stable, as the mountains are stable, as the whole universe is stable, so may our union be permanently settled."

In popular culture
 In 1961, a  Bengali film was released in Tollywood, directed by Ajoy Kar, named Saptapadi. It is a love story with a twist set in Bengal in pre-independent India (early 1940); the time when young Indian students were competing equally with British 'goras' in all fields, whether it be education or sports.
 In 1981 a Telugu film was released named Saptapadi, directed by Kaasinathuni Viswanath; this film won a National Award in Indian Films.
 Saptapadii, a Gujarati film directed by Niranjan Thade, was released in 2013. The music of the film is given by Rajat Dholakia & Piyush Kanojia. Popular TV actor Manav Gohil stars opposite Swaroop Sampat. It also stars child actor Heet Samani. Produced by Amitabh Bachchan’s AB Corp and leading event management company Slash Production, the film is written by Niranjan Thade, Chandrakant Shah & Kaajal Oza Vaidya. Its worldwide distributor is Different Strokes Communications Pvt. Ltd. (Dr. Devdatt Kapadia and Mrinal Kapadia)

See also
Hindu wedding

References

Hindu wedding rituals